Aenigmatite, also known as Cossyrite after Cossyra, the ancient name of Pantelleria, is a sodium, iron, titanium inosilicate mineral. The chemical formula is Na2Fe2+5TiSi6O20 and its structure consists of single tetrahedral chains with a repeat unit of four and complex side branches. It forms brown to black triclinic lamellar crystals. It has Mohs hardness of 5.5 to 6 and specific gravity of 3.74 to 3.85. Aenigmatite forms a solid-solution series with wilkinsonite, Na2Fe2+4Fe3+2Si6O20.

Aenigmatite is primarily found in peralkaline volcanic rocks, pegmatites, and granites as well as silica-poor intrusive rocks. It was first described by August Breithaupt in 1865 for an occurrence in the Ilimaussaq intrusive complex of southwest Greenland. Its name comes from αίνιγμα, the Greek word for "riddle".

It was also reported from the Kaidun meteorite, possibly a Mars meteorite, which landed in March 1980 in South Yemen. Other notable studied occurrences include: 
 Narsaarsuk and elsewhere in Greenland. 
 The Khibiny and Lovozero alkaline massifs on Kola Peninsula, Russia.
 The Yenisei Range, Krasnoyarsk Krai, Russia.  
 The volcanic island of Pantelleria, Italy. 
 In the US, from Granite Mountain, near Little Rock, Pulaski County, Arkansas, and Santa Rosa, Sonoma County, California.
 In Australia, from Warrumbungle volcano, Nandewar volcano, and the Mount Warning complex, New South Wales; and the Peak Range Province, Queensland. 
 In Canada, from Mount Edziza, the Ilgachuz and Rainbow Range shield complexes.
 From Logan Point quarry, Dunedin volcano, New Zealand.

See also
 List of minerals

References

Sodium minerals
Iron(II) minerals
Titanium minerals
Inosilicates
Triclinic minerals
Minerals in space group 2